Barack Obama Plaza is a motorway service area on the R445 road at Junction 23, just off the M7 motorway in County Tipperary, Ireland. It is beside the village of Moneygall, which is just across the county border in County Offaly, and is accessed using the Junction 23 slip roads. It is named after former US president Barack Obama, whose third great-grandfather, Falmouth Kearney, lived in Moneygall and who emigrated to the US in 1850.

The Plaza cost €7 million to construct and opened on 30 May 2014. An Obama museum–visitor centre opened on the following 4 July. The Plaza is owned and operated by Pat McDonagh and his wife Una McDonagh.

Facilities

The service station operating under the Circle K brand has 26 petrol pumps across two forecourts offering unleaded petrol, diesel, MGO (marine gas oil), diesel exhaust fluid, and LPG (liquefied petroleum gas). Charging stations including afast-charge ESB electric car charge point.

In addition to fuel supplies there is a variety of food outlets including Supermac's, Papa John's Pizza, Mac's Place Bakery and Carvery, Bewleys coffee and a Spar shop. The Plaza also includes a visitor centre that provides information on Obama's family connections to Moneygall where his great-great-great-grandfather lived, as well as five meeting rooms and a large function room.

A bus service, No. 854 between Roscrea and Nenagh, calls at Barack Obama Plaza seven days a week. The service connects with the local communities of Toomevara, Cloughjordan and Shinrone.

Art 

A bronze bust of Barack Obama by Mark Rhodes, and commissioned by Plaza owner, Pat McDonagh, was unveiled inside the Plaza by the US Ambassador to Ireland, Kevin O'Malley, on 22 September 2016. On 20 August 2018, life-sized bronze sculptures of Barack and Michelle Obama, also by Mark Rhodes, were unveiled outside the Plaza by Cody Keenan, a former Obama speechwriter.

References

Road infrastructure in the Republic of Ireland
Buildings and structures in County Tipperary
Michelle Obama
Monuments to Barack Obama